Gilbert Lavoine (1921–1965) was a French boxer.

External links

1921 births
1965 deaths
French male boxers
20th-century French people